Supremacy 1914 is a multiplayer real-time strategy browser game created and published by German studio Bytro Labs, in which the player manages one of the countries in the world during World War I. The player competes with countries controlled by other players playing the same game and with countries controlled by the computer. Resource management, province upgrades, coalitions and alliances play key roles in the game, in addition to the conquest aspect. The main view of the game is a map that could be zoomed in and out, but there was also a province view, which allows you see the upgrades to that province in a more realistic view than the list format that many games of this type have.

The game is hosted in Germany where many of its players are located, but a substantial number of players also come from the United States, Spain, the United Kingdom, Japan and Italy among many other nations. Over 4,000 unique players come online each day. It was ranked the 2009 Browser Game of the Year by Game Genetics.

Call of War is set in 1942 and is the World War II version of the game, which includes the eventual option of using nuclear weapons. It is also from Bytro Labs.

Game World 
The game world is divided into provinces, each province containing a town and roads connecting to neighboring provinces, and (if the province is on the coast) to the bordering seas and oceans. The player observes the world as a map marked with the units and provinces where the color indicates the owner, and each country is assigned a color that remains the same in all games. All nations not under player control are controlled by the AI, and inactive players can be kicked and replaced by the AI after a preset time.
Games take place on official maps of the following parts of the world:

 Map 1 - Europe 1914 (10 players): The standard scenario: 10 evenly balanced nations with slightly different resource allocations grant a fair and interesting start for all players. Normal provinces all have the same resource production and no nation has a preset advantage.
 Map 2 - Europe 1910 historic (8 players): Map with the historically correct borders of 1910. Nations differ in size and population, which has an effect on a province's resource production. This map is especially well suited for team scenario modes, pitting the Entente (Britain, France, Italy, Russia) against the Central Powers (German Empire, Austria-Hungary, Ottoman Empire, Bulgaria).This is a premium map and requires to pay 5000 "goldmarks"(premium currency) to join/create.
 Map 3 - The Great War (Contains Eastern North America, North Africa and a part of the Middle east) (31 players): A large map with parts of North America, Africa, and Asia bordering the focal point of Europe. Nations are evenly balanced in resource production and starting military strength. The key to survival and victory are alliances and logistical superiority in managing long supply lines.
 Map 4 - Battle for Western Europe (4 players): This more detailed map of Western Europe only has the nations of France, Germany, Austria and Great Britain, and is designed for fast-paced 2v2 games.
 Map 5 - Southeast Asia (15 players): An East Asian map with 15 evenly balanced nations and a large number of islands.
 Map 6 - South America 1914 (10 players): A balanced map purely of the South American continent, where land warfare is predominant and with long distances between some provinces.
 Map 7 - Middle East 1914 (30 players): This map contains all of North Africa, the Middle East, and the European countries bordering on the Mediterranean Sea. Nations are evenly balanced in production, strength, and resources. The key to victory is diplomacy and clever resource management in a part of the world where some resources are abundant and others are very scarce.
 Map 8 - USA vs Mexico (2 players): A map centered on the Gulf of Mexico, with the Southern United States and Mexico as the primary nations.
 Map 9 - A World in Flames (100 players): This map contains the whole world, it is a smaller version of The Great War. This is a map where units can "wrap around" the globe, i.e. crossing the Pacific Ocean.
 Map 10 - The Great War (500 players): A map of the entire world with independent regions instead of countries(like Tuscany or Virginia). This is also a map where units can "wrap around" the globe.
Map 11 - Battle of the Balkans(6 players): Map with the nations of the Balkan region including: The Ottoman Empire, Austria-Hungary, Italy, Greece, Bulgaria, Russia ruled by players as well as United Kingdom and German Empire and Crimea as AI countries.
Map 12 - Europe 1914 Historic (8 players): Map with the historically correct borders of 1914. Nations differ in size and population, which has an effect on a province's resource production. This map is especially well suited for team scenario modes, pitting the Entente (Britain, France, Italy, Russia) against the Central Powers (German Empire, Austria-Hungary, Ottoman Empire, Bulgaria).This is a premium map and requires to pay 5000 "goldmarks"(premium currency) to join/create.
Map 13 - Tournament Island (10 players): A map where two teams are pitted against each other in a 5 vs 5 fight in a perfectly symmetrical island. Both teams are perfectly balanced and have same conditions. This is a premium map and requires to pay 5000 "goldmarks"(premium currency) to join/create.

There are also some events with different maps.

Games typically last for four to eight weeks, though this figure can vary widely based on the map, the choices made by individual players, and many other factors.

In-game features

Military units 
The armies are mainly composed of infantry, and as the infrastructure in provinces is upgraded, the ability to build mechanized troops, such as artillery and tanks, is unlocked. All land units can be transported by sea without the need for a specialized troopship. Other units the player can build include railguns, which have a large range, and battleships, which can attack at sea. Players can also produce other special surveillance blimps, fighters and bombers, submarines, and light cruisers. Troops receive their orders directly from the map view and begin carrying them out immediately, taking a preset amount of time to travel to their destinations.

Provinces 
A different resource (grain, fish, iron, lumber, coal, oil or gas) is produced in each province. These resources are split into food, materials and energy resources, each of which can be consumed at different rates that the player can adjust with sliders. There are several types of buildings that can be built in a province, which may require resources to construct. Recruiting offices and barracks are used for troop production, barracks requiring the upkeep of grain each day. Workshops, which can be later upgraded into factories, enable the production of mechanized units. Fortresses reduce the damage taken by troops inside the province. Harbours (which can only be placed in coastal provinces) decrease embarkation and disembarkation times. Railways speed up troop movement within a province, and are required for railguns to move across the map. In addition, factories, harbors, and railways increase resource production in a province. Each province consumes 800 of each of food, materials, and energy per day. The resource produced by a province may decrease in case the country grows too vast - some amount is wasted due to corruption.

Morale 
Morale plays an important role in the game. Provinces with low morale can rebel and join another country, troops with low morale are less effective in battle, and high morale provides a resource production boost. Province morale is influenced by a variety of factors, including the morale of neighbouring provinces, how many upgrades are on that province, and how close it is to the capital.

Diplomacy and espionage 
In the game, you can declare war on other countries, form alliances, create coalitions and impose trade embargoes. You can also correspond with other players, and send spies to intercept communications of other countries. Spies can also track the movements and locations of troops and carry out sabotage or reveal the country's relationship with others.

The Daily European, or The World Herald 
The game has a daily in-game newspaper that contains generated articles about current events in the world, such as the casualties in a war or damage to province infrastructure, as well as articles written by the players. Player-written articles can be submitted anonymously, and premium members in the "High Command" can include images to accompany their articles. The newspaper also shows the current game rankings in certain metrics. In role-playing games, players often write articles about fictitious events in their country. It may be important to check the newspaper to search for any war that can advantage you.

Goldmarks 

While the game itself is free, a player can purchase a special currency called "Goldmarks" for which you can receive bonuses to give an advantage in the game. For example, it can be used to reduce the length of construction, increase troop morale, and purchase "master spies" which immediately execute their missions. Players can also win Goldmark by finishing games at a high position in the rankings. Goldmark are also used to enter special games, which have enhanced options, such as "Elite AI" and air and/or naval packs.

High Command 
The High Command is a premium account feature that allows you to have access to more stuff than a standard user. The High Command gives you access to the following: general mobilization, rally points, build queue, advanced fire control, shared intelligence, custom article images, and free gold rounds.

Alliances 
Alliances can be formed in a single game (see Diplomacy and espionage above) and in an official alliance for all games entered. Alliances are groups of players (not agreements between the countries controlled by them) who want to play together. They organize the fight against other alliances as well as internal games within the alliance. An alliance may be established by any player.

Coalitions 
Coalitions are a temporary alliance that can be created in every game.
You can give it a name, upload a photo and a description. They can have 2 to 5 allies (depending on the map) .
Chat is also available.
When leaving a coalition, you will have to wait 3 days before joining or creating another.

Ranking 
Another feature is a ranking system that tracks your progress throughout your entire career in the game. Points are calculated on nearly everything you do, from province upgrades to victory medals to certain diplomacy tasks. Some games have a minimum rank required in order to join.
In addition, Call of War (A World War II strategy game by Bytro Labs, developed September 1, 2015) also ranks its players in this fashion. (Bytro Labs, 42-90 Falskirche, Hamburg, Deutschland; 2015) Rome, Berlin, London, Bucharest, and Moscow are worth 25 points each in "Call of War 1939". Tobruk, Warsaw, Stalingrad and other cities are worth between nine and 15 victory points each.  The points system is open to amendment.

Special Games 
The S1914 community usually creates its own games through the website, but every now and then Bytro organizes a single-player and alliance tournament. Other player-organized games can be popular in the community. Many role-playing ideas are plausible due to Supremacy's diverse units and provinces. Roleplays can take place in real-lifetime periods, and also fictional worlds, and the game's events play out as such. Players can also set up private games and only allow specific people into it.

References

External links 
 Official game website

2009 video games
Browser games
Real-time strategy video games
Video games developed in Germany
World War I video games